Chen Jingrong (2 September 1917 – 8 November 1989) was a Chinese poet and translator.

Biography
Born in Leshan, Sichuan, she started publishing her first poetry in 1937. In 1938 he joined the All-China Anti-Japanese Association of Writers and Artists in Chengdu. During the war with Japan, she was part of the National Literary League of Resisting the Enemies. She moved to Lanzhou, Chongqing and then Shanghai. It was there when she became closely associated with the 'Nine leaves' poets.

In 1949 she entered Huabei University. After 1949, she started focusing on translating foreign poetry and was editor of World Literature. Many books of poems and prose have appeared. She retired in 1973.

Works

Poetry

Translations

References
"Chen Jingrong", Renditions, a Chinese-English Translation Magazine, last accessed June 6, 2007

Chinese women poets
People's Republic of China poets
Republic of China novelists
Writers from Leshan
1917 births
1989 deaths
People's Republic of China translators
20th-century Chinese women writers
20th-century Chinese writers
20th-century Chinese translators
20th-century Chinese novelists
20th-century Chinese poets
Poets from Sichuan
Chinese women novelists
People's Republic of China novelists